Craig Odell, better known by his pen name Craig Alanson, is an American author and audio playwright of science fiction and fantasy works, most notably the New York Times best-selling Expeditionary Force series.

Career 
Alanson began writing in 2006, developing his novels at nights and on weekends while working full-time. He began self publishing novels on Amazon in 2016. One of his three debut novels was Columbus Day, the first book in the Expeditionary Force ( ExForce ) series. The commercial success of Columbus Day, and the follow-up SpecOps, allowed Alanson to become a full-time writer. Alanson signed with Podium Publishing to produce the audiobook versions of the novels (Podium had previously produced the audiobook of Andy Weir's The Martian). The Expeditionary Force books are performed by award-winning narrator R. C. Bray, who had also narrated The Martian. The audiobook for Columbus Day was nominated for an "Audiobook of the Year" Audie Award in 2018.

In 2017 Alanson wrote a standalone novella called Trouble in Paradise, expanding on the events that take place between books three and four in the ExForce series. The novella laid the foundations for a short spin-off series set within the same fictional universe, entitled Mavericks. In 2019, Alanson committed to write a total of fourteen novels for Expeditionary Force and three Mavericks novels, though the third Mavericks novel was later revised as an ExForce title making it fifteen books in total for ExForce and two for Mavericks. Alanson published the final book, Failure Mode, in December 2022.

In 2017, Alanson released the audiobooks of the other two novels he had originally self-published alongside Columbus Day in 2016; a standalone young adult science-fiction story called Aces and an epic fantasy novel called Ascendant, the first book in the Ascendant trilogy. The Ascendant audiobooks were narrated by Tim Gerard Reynolds.

In 2019, the Homefront story within the Expeditionary Force series was released as an audio drama starring Star Trek alumni Kate Mulgrew, Zachary Quinto and Robert Picardo along with the audiobook narrator R.C. Bray. Alanson has expressed a desire to write and release a novelization of the play. In 2019, the Expeditionary Force series was optioned by Milmar Pictures for a Television series.

The audiobook for the twelfth novel in the series, Breakaway, debuted at number one on Audible for audio fiction and reached No. 5 on The New York Times Best Seller list in June 2021. The thirteenth book in series, Fallout, also debuted at number one on Audible for audio fiction when it was released in December 2021, and reached No. 10 on the New York Times Best Seller list.

Alanson has announced that after completing ExForce in 2022, his next series will be an urban fantasy called Convergence, with the first book in the series also called Convergence. In June 2022, Alanson announced on an AMA Reddit that while the ExForce series will officially end after book 15, he will write at least one additional novella set in the same fictional universe.

Personal life 

Alanson lives in South Hero in Vermont with his wife Irene.

He was unable to pursue a career as a pilot in the United States Navy due to red-green color blindness. Alanson began working at United Technologies in Connecticut straight from school, working on Aerospace projects. He moved to Gainesville in Virginia to work on defense contracts with United, which gave him exposure to the military jargon and concepts he would later use in his novels. Alanson later moved into finance, working for Hewlett-Packard where he wrote financial reports.

Works

Novels

Expeditionary Force (ExForce) 
A space opera describing the events after humanity is thrust into a galactic war following an alien invasion of Earth. The chief protagonists are Joe Bishop, a soldier in the United States Army, and Skippy, an advanced Artificial intelligence from an ancient civilization who befriends Joe. Alanson describes Battle: Los Angeles as the initial inspiration for the story. Expeditionary Force has been released in both English and Polish, with the Polish Ebooks published by Drageus Publishing House and the audiobook editions published by Heraclon International & StoryBox and narrated by Wojciech Masiak.

Mavericks 
A spin-off from Expeditionary Force focused on a group of human soldiers cut-off from Earth.

Convergence 
A contemporary urban fantasy series.

Ascendant 
A young-adult fantasy series following a boy with magical abilities as he discovers he is a Wizard.

Others

Audio Dramas

Awards 

 Columbus Day – Audie Award – Audiobook of the Year 2018 (Nominated)

References

External links 

 Craig Alanson in the Internet Speculative Fiction Database
 Craig Alanson in Goodreads

Living people
American male novelists
American science fiction writers
21st-century American novelists
American fantasy writers
People from Springfield, Massachusetts
1962 births
People from South Hero, Vermont
21st-century pseudonymous writers